Carl Phillips (born 1959) is an American writer and poet. He is a Professor of English at Washington University in St. Louis.

Early life
Phillips was born in Everett, Washington. He was born a child of a military family, moving year-by-year until finally settling in his high-school years on Cape Cod, Massachusetts. A graduate of Harvard University, the University of Massachusetts Amherst, and Boston University, Phillips taught high-school Latin for eight years.

Works

His first collection of poems, In the Blood, won the 1992 Samuel French Morse Poetry Prize, and his second book, Cortège, was nominated for a 1995 National Book Critics Circle Award. His Pastoral won the 2001 Lambda Literary Award for Best Poetry. Phillips' work has been published in the Yale Review, Atlantic Monthly, The New Yorker and the Paris Review. He was named a Witter Bynner Fellowshipin 1998 and in 2006, he was named the recipient of the Fellowship of the Academy of American Poets, given in memory of James Merrill.

In 2002, Phillips received the Kingsley Tufts Poetry Award, for The Tether. In 2004, he published All It Takes. He won the Thom Gunn Award in 2005 for The Rest of Love.

His poems, which include themes of spirituality, sexuality, mortality, and faith, are featured in American Alphabets: 25 Contemporary Poets (2006) and many other anthologies.

In 2015, Phillips released his 13th collection of poems, Reconnaissance, which was nominated for an NAACP Image Award for Best Poetry and appeared on the Top Books list from Canada's The Globe and Mail.  Phillips was also a featured poet in the "Picture and a Poem" series for T: The New York Times Style Magazine in December 2015. Reconnaissance won the Lambda Literary Award and the PEN Center USA Award.

Recognition
Phillips is a four-time finalist for the National Book Award. He received the 2002 Kingsley Tufts Award and the 2021 Jackson Poetry Prize.

Phillips was a judge for the 2010 Griffin Poetry Prize. 
In April 2010, he was named as the new judge of the Yale Series of Younger Poets, replacing Louise Gluck.  
In 2011, he was appointed to the judging panel for The Kingsley and Kate Tufts Poetry Awards. His collection of poetry, Double Shadow, was a finalist for the 2011 National Book Award for poetry. Double Shadow won the 2011 Los Angeles Times Book Prize (Poetry category).

Phillips was a Chancellor of the Academy of American Poets from 2008 to 2012. and he was nominated for the 2014 Griffin Poetry Prize for Silverchest.

The Board of Trustees of The Kenyon Review honored Carl Phillips as the 2013 recipient of the Kenyon Review Award for Literary Achievement.

Selected bibliography

 In the Blood. UPNE, 1992; selected and introduced by Rachel Hadas. 
 Cortège, Saint Paul, Minn.: Graywolf Press, 1995, 
 From the Devotions, Saint Paul, Minn.: Graywolf Press, 1998, 
 Pastoral, Saint Paul, Minn.: Graywolf Press, 2000, 
 The Tether, New York: Farrar, Straus and Giroux, 2001, 
 Rock Harbor, New York: Farrar, Straus and Giroux, 2002, 
 The Rest of Love, New York: Farrar, Straus and Giroux, 2004, 
 Coin of the Realm: Essays on the Art and Life of Poetry, Saint Paul, Minn.: Graywolf Press, 2004, 
 
 
 Speak Low, New York: Farrar, Straus and Giroux, 2009, 
 Double Shadow, New York: Farrar, Straus and Giroux, 2011, 
 Silverchest, New York: Farrar, Straus and Giroux, 2013, 
 The Art of Daring: Risk, Restlessness, Imagination. Minneapolis: Graywolf Press, 2014,  (print),  (eBook)
 Reconnaissance: Poems, New York: Farrar, Straus and Giroux, 2015, 
 Wild Is the Wind, New York: Farrar, Straus and Giroux, 2018, 
 Pale Colors in a Tall Field, New York: Farrar, Straus and Giroux, 2020,

Critical studies, reviews and biography

References

External links
Poetry Is His Perfect Expression
A Broadside by Carl Phillips (Green Linden Press 2019): "Like the Sweet Wet Earth Itself"
Article at the Library of Congress
Washington University in St. Louis: Poet Carl Phillips is finalist for National Book Award
Poetry.LA's video of Carl Phillips' reading at Boston Court Performing Arts Center, Pasadena, CA, 03/08/10
2009 National Book Award Finalist in Poetry
Phillips Interview on Words on a Wire

1959 births
American male poets
Poets from Missouri
Poets from Massachusetts
University of Massachusetts Amherst alumni
Harvard Advocate alumni
Washington University in St. Louis faculty
Iowa Writers' Workshop faculty
American gay writers
American LGBT poets
Living people
Place of birth missing (living people)
Lambda Literary Award for Gay Poetry winners
African-American poets
20th-century American poets
21st-century American poets
20th-century American male writers
21st-century American male writers
Gay poets